Talhan is a village in Jalandhar district, near the Jalandhar Cantonment, in Punjab, India.

Demographics
According to the 2001 Census, Talhan has a population of 2,946 people. The village has .

Baba Shaheed Nihal Singh

Talhan is famous for its Shaheedi Jor mela, which is held annually in the memory of Shaheed Baba Nihal Singh. The mela  is a big attraction in Jalandhar. The 58th Jor Mela was held on 20–21 June 2009.

Baba Nihal Singh belonged to the neighbouring village of Dakoha. Baba Nihal Singh made pulleys for drinking water wells. He served the people by installing the pulleys at the base of the well. Local people believe that as the Baba was divine, no matter which water well Baba installed a pulley, the water wells never dried up and the water remained sweet.

On one occasion, the Baba met with a fatal accident, whilst installing a pulley and the Baba became a martyr whilst serving the people.

The people of Talhan constructed a shrine (Samadh) in Talhan. The shrine was looked after by the Baba Nihal Singh's associate, Harnam Singh. After Harnam Singh's death, the followers cremated him next to the Baba's Samadhi.

The two shrines have now become a grand Gurudwara. An annual Mela is held to mark the death anniversary ("Barsi") of the Baba. This Mela is a grand event in Jalandhar. There are sports events like Kabbadi, volleyball and tug-of-war. Gatka (Sikh martial arts) displays are held.

Religion
Talhan has a mixed population of Sikhs and Hindus. The village also has one Muslim family whose Iqbal Bibi is the sole caretaker of the "mazaar" (dargah) of Pir Baba Fateh Shah Qadir. The "mazaar" is located in the north-west of Talhan and is about a kilometre from Gurdwara Shaheed Baba Nihal Singh. The "mazaar" includes three graves, a "tomb" and the care taker is Baba Paramjit Singh Bains. The village participates in the annual urs or Mela  where Qawwali's and folk singers perform. There is an annual Mela which is celebrated by Sehgal's. This Mela is celebrated at their holy place known as the Jathere of Sehgal family.

Talhan caste conflict
The Talhan conflict is a very important event in the assertion of dalit rights in Punjab. 60% of the population is from the scheduled caste and are mainly from the Chamar caste. In June 2003, Talhan hit the headlines in when a forceful assertion of the majority dalit community of Chamars took on members of the Jat community; they wanted a share on the governing committee of the Shaheed Baba Nihal Singh Gurdwara.  Though the Chamar community form more than 60 percent of Talhan's 3,000-strong population, they were denied a share in the committee.

As a result of a protracted dispute between the villagers, members of the dalit and other communities engage in running all aspects of the village administration .

General
Neighbouring villages include Parasrampur, Kotli Than Singh, Bhakriana, Semmi, Salempur Masanda, Dhanowali, Dakoha, Dhilwan  and Puranpur.

The village has many castes with surnames such as Jassi , Bains, Sander, Bhogal, Sandhu, Chahal, Bal and Randhawa. The Bains families are divided into two "pattis" (family divisions): Burha Magu and Rurha Deepa and claim ancestry from Baba Tula who was originally from either Baria village or Bahowal village near Mahilpur.

The village Gurudwara is also famous as Visa Request Gurudwara as devotees bring aeroplane replica to request an approval of VISA applications.

The village has shops, two banks, Jathera, a Secondary School, a Mosque, temples, a Post Office  and four Gurdwara's
 Gurdwara Sri Guru Ravidass ji Talhan
 Gurdwara Singh Sabha Talhan
 Gurdwara Shaheed Baba Harnam Singh ji Talhan
 Gurdwara Shaheed Baba Nihal Singh ji Talhan

Location map

References

Villages in Jalandhar district